House Rent Party is an album by the American blues pianist/vocalist Sunnyland Slim, compiling six recordings originally issued by Apollo Records with additional unreleased tracks from 1949 with Jimmy Rogers and St. Louis Jimmy and two tracks performed by Willie Mabon, that was released by the Delmark label in 1992.

Reception

Allmusic reviewer Scott Yanow stated "From deep in the vaults of Apollo Records comes this sensational collection of 1949 artifacts by the veteran pianist, along with sides by singer St. Louis Jimmy, young pianist Willie Mabon, and two unissued sides by guitarist Jimmy Rogers ... all from the emerging heyday of the genre.".

Track listing
All compositions by Albert Luandrew except where noted
 "I'm Just a Lonesome Man" – 2:39
 "Sad Old Sunday (Mother's Day)" – 2:01
 "Boogie Man" (Willie Mabon) – 3:13
 "Hard Time (When Mother's Gone)" – 2:43 previously unreleased
 "Chicago Woman" – 2:54
 "I'm in Love" – 2:33 previously unreleased
 "Bad Times (Cost of Living)" – 2:53
 "Nervous Breakdown" – 2:45 previously unreleased
 "It Keeps Rainin'" (Willie Mabon) – 2:49
 "Brown Skin Woman" – 2:36 previously unreleased
 "Old Age Has Got Me" – 2:45 previously unreleased
 "That's All Right" (Jimmy Rogers) – 2:27 previously unreleased
 "Sad Old Sunday" [alternate take] – 3:30 previously unreleased
 "I'm Just a Lonesome Man"  [alternate take] – 2:50 previously unreleased
 "Bad Times"  [alternate take] – 2:47 previously unreleased

Personnel
Sunnyland Slim – piano, vocals (tracks 1, 2, 4-8 & 10-15)
Jimmy Rogers – guitar, vocals (tracks 6 & 12)
Willie Mabon – vocals, piano, harmonica (tracks 3 & 9)
St. Louis Jimmy – vocals (tracks 2, 5, 8, 11 & 13)
Sam Casimir (tracks 1, 2, 4, 5, 7, 8, 10, 11 & 13-15), Earl Dranes (tracks 3 & 9) – guitar 
Andrew Harris – bass (tracks 1, 2, 4-8 & 10-15)

References

Delmark Records albums
1992 albums
Sunnyland Slim albums
Albums produced by Bob Koester